John Robert Oosthuizen (born 23 January 1987) is a South African javelin thrower. He is a second generation athlete following in his father Johan Oosthuizen's footstep. Oosthuizen senior's, who never got the chance to represent his country in international competition, biggest achievement is a throw of 80.92 metres, which he achieved in 1990.

Oosthuizen junior's personal best throw is 86.80 metres which he achieved at the Yellow Pages meeting in Oudsthoorn on 1 March 2008. The throw was better than his 84.52 metres, achieved at the 2007 World Championships in Osaka and helped him to qualify for the 2008 Olympic Games in Beijing.

Achievements

Seasonal bests by year
2005 - 75.94
2006 - 83.07
2007 - 84.52
2008 - 86.80
2009 - 81.18
2010 - 82.96
2011 - 84.38
2012 - 77.18
2013 - 81.97
2014 - 79.57

External links 

1987 births
Living people
Afrikaner people
South African people of Dutch descent
South African male javelin throwers
Athletes (track and field) at the 2006 Commonwealth Games
Commonwealth Games competitors for South Africa
Athletes (track and field) at the 2008 Summer Olympics
Olympic athletes of South Africa
African Games gold medalists for South Africa
African Games medalists in athletics (track and field)
Universiade medalists in athletics (track and field)
Athletes (track and field) at the 2007 All-Africa Games
Universiade silver medalists for South Africa
Medalists at the 2013 Summer Universiade